St. Francisville or Saint Francisville is a city in Lawrence County, Illinois, United States. The population was 697 at the 2010 census.

History

St. Francisville is rooted in a stockade built by Joseph Tougas in the early 1810s.  The city was platted by Tougas's widow in the mid-1830s.  It was named for St. Francis Xavier, reflecting the growing influence of Jesuit missionaries in the area. The city incorporated in 1873.

Geography
St. Francisville is located in southeastern Lawrence County in the southeast corner of Denison Township. It is on the west bank of the Wabash River, which forms the state border with Indiana.

Demographics

As of the census of 2000, there were 759 people, 317 households, and 221 families residing in the city. The racial makeup of the city was 99.21% White, 0.13% African American, and 0.66% from two or more races.

There were 317 households, out of which 34.1% had children under the age of 18 living with them, 52.4% were married couples living together, 12.3% had a female householder with no husband present, and 30.0% were non-families. 27.8% of all households were made up of individuals, and 12.3% had someone living alone who was 65 years of age or older. The average household size was 2.39 and the average family size was 2.89.

In the city, the population was spread out, with 26.0% under the age of 18, 8.2% from 18 to 24, 27.4% from 25 to 44, 22.3% from 45 to 64, and 16.2% who were 65 years of age or older. The median age was 38 years. For every 100 females, there were 92.2 males. For every 100 females age 18 and over, there were 90.5 males.

The median income for a household in the city was $25,543, and the median income for a family was $29,688. Males had a median income of $30,417 versus $15,938 for females. The per capita income for the city was $12,955. About 19.7% of families and 21.1% of the population were below the poverty line, including 41.4% of those under age 18 and 3.2% of those age 65 or over.

As of the census of 2010 the population of St. Francisville was 697.

Economy
St. Francisville is noted for a locally grown variety of popcorn, trademarked as "Black Jewell" for the color of the corn kernels. The popcorn packer attributes the varietal snack food to development work in the "mid 1960s."

Notable person
Julian Morgenstern (1881–1976), rabbi, professor, and president of Hebrew Union College, born in St. Francisville
William Phipps, retired actor and film producer, moved to St. Francisville when he was six, and grew up there.

References

Cities in Lawrence County, Illinois
Cities in Illinois